Andrus Öövel (born 17 October 1957 Tallinn) is an Estonian rower and politician. From 1995 until 1999, he was Minister of Defence. He was a member of VIII Riigikogu. He was a 24-time champion of rowing in the Estonian SSR between 1974 and 1984.

References

1957 births
Living people
Estonian Coalition Party politicians
Members of the Riigikogu, 1995–1999
Defence Ministers of Estonia
Estonian male rowers
Recipients of the Order of the National Coat of Arms, 4th Class
Hugo Treffner Gymnasium alumni
University of Tartu alumni
Politicians from Tallinn
Sportspeople from Tallinn